Dan Murphy (born 27 October 1985 in Romford, Havering, England) is a rugby union player for Harlequins in the Aviva Premiership. Murphy's position of choice is as a prop.

He joined Gloucester Rugby for the 2011/2012 season. On 2 April 2013, it was announced that Murphy had signed a two-year contract extension to keep him at Gloucester until the end of the 2014–15 season. On 15 January 2015, Murphy signed a new three-year contract extension to stay with Gloucester until the end of the 2017–18 season.

However, Murphy announced he parted ways with Gloucester, after granted his early contract release, where he would officially join Harlequins from the 2016–17 season.

On 13 June 2017, Murphy left Harlequins to join Gloucestershire based club Hartpury RFC in the RFU Championship from the 2017–18 season.

References

External links
Gloucester Rugby profile
London Irish profile

1985 births
Living people
London Irish players
People educated at St Joseph's College, Ipswich